Patricia Helen Heaton (born March 4, 1958) is an American actress and comedian. She is best known for her work on sitcoms, having played Debra Barone on Everybody Loves Raymond (1996–2005) as well as Frances "Frankie" Heck on The Middle (2009–2018).

Heaton is a three-time Emmy Award winner – twice winning the Primetime Emmy Award for Outstanding Lead Actress in a Comedy Series for Everybody Loves Raymond, and a Daytime Emmy Award for Outstanding Culinary Program as host of Patricia Heaton Parties (2015–2016).

Early life
Patricia Heaton was born in Bay Village, Ohio, the daughter of Patricia (née Hurd) and Chuck Heaton, who was a sportswriter for The Plain Dealer. When she was 12, her mother died of an aneurysm. The fourth of five children, Heaton was raised as a devout Catholic.

Heaton has three sisters, Sharon (now a Dominican nun, and presently assistant registrar at Aquinas College in Nashville), Alice, and Frances, and one brother, Michael, who died in September 2022 at the age of 66 and was the "Minister of Culture" columnist for The Plain Dealer and a writer for the paper's Friday Magazine.

Career
While attending Ohio State University, she became a sister of Delta Gamma sorority. She later graduated with a Bachelor of Arts in drama. In 1980, Heaton moved to New York City to study with drama teacher William Esper. Heaton made her first Broadway appearance in the chorus of Don't Get God Started (1987), after which fellow students and she created Stage Three, an off-Broadway acting troupe.

Heaton auditioned for the role of Elaine Benes on Seinfeld.

When Stage Three brought one of its productions to Los Angeles, Heaton caught the eye of a casting director for the ABC drama Thirtysomething. She was cast as an oncologist, leading to six appearances on the series from 1989 to 1991. Other TV guest appearances include: Alien Nation (1989), Matlock (1990), Party of Five (1996), The King of Queens (1999), and Danny Phantom (2004).

Heaton's feature films include Memoirs of an Invisible Man (1992), Beethoven (1992), The New Age (1994), and Space Jam (1996).

Heaton was featured in three short-lived sitcoms—Room for Two, Someone Like Me and Women of the House—before landing the role of Debra Barone on Everybody Loves Raymond. She was nominated in each of the series' last seven seasons for the Primetime Emmy Award for Outstanding Lead Actress in a Comedy Series, winning in 2000 and 2001. With her win in 2000, she became the first of the cast members on the show to win an Emmy. She has also collected two Viewers for Quality Television Awards and a Screen Actors Guild trophy for her work on the series.

Starting September 2007, Heaton co-starred with Kelsey Grammer in Back to You, a situation comedy on Fox. The show was canceled in May 2008.

Heaton appeared on the season seven of Extreme Makeover: Home Edition where she helped build a home for a firefighter and his family.

Heaton's television movies include Shattered Dreams (1990), Miracle in the Woods (1997), A Town Without Christmas (2001), the remake of Neil Simon's  The Goodbye Girl (2004) with Jeff Daniels, and The Engagement Ring (2005). Heaton also played former U.S. Ambassador to Yemen, Barbara Bodine, in the 2006 ABC docudrama The Path to 9/11, and the Hallmark Hall of Fame movie Front of the Class, based on the real story of a mother, Ellen Cohen, raising a son, Brad Cohen, who has Tourette syndrome, in 2008.

Heaton was the producer for the 2005 documentary The Bituminous Coal Queens of Pennsylvania, which was directed by her husband, David Hunt. She was also one of the producers of the William Wilberforce drama Amazing Grace (2006).

In January 2007, Heaton returned to the stage to co-star with Tony Shalhoub in the off-Broadway play The Scene at Second Stage Theatre in New York City. For this performance, Heaton was nominated in the Outstanding Lead Actress category for the 22nd Lucille Lortel Awards.

From September 2009 to May 2018, she starred in the ABC comedy The Middle as Frankie Heck.

In 2011, Heaton was ranked at number 24 on the TV Guide Network special, Funniest Women on TV.

In October 2015, Heaton began hosting Patricia Heaton Parties, a cooking show on Food Network. The program showcases party-friendly foods and home-entertaining tips. The series won a Daytime Emmy Award in 2016 for Outstanding Culinary Program.

She received a star on the Hollywood Walk of Fame on May 22, 2012. Her production company is FourBoys Entertainment.

Other credits
In 2003, Heaton appeared in a series of television and radio commercials as spokesperson for the various incarnations of the grocery chain Albertsons, such as Acme, Jewel and Shaw's. Heaton also was featured on the cover of the company's 2003 and 2004 annual reports. In 2007, Albertsons created the Crazy About Food slogan/campaign and Heaton's association with the company ended. She has also appeared in advertisements for Pantene hair-care products.

Heaton wrote a book called Your Second Act: Inspiring Stories of Transformation with a release date of July 21, 2020.

She is set to appear in the upcoming drama film Mending the Line, opposite Wes Studi, Perry Mattfeld, Chris Galust and Irene Bedard, and directed by Joshua Caldwell.

Personal life

Heaton has been married to English actor and director David Hunt since 1990. They have four sons and as of 2002, they divide their time between Los Angeles and Cambridge. Her memoir, Motherhood and Hollywood: How to Get a Job Like Mine, was published by Villard Books in 2002.

After her divorce from her first husband, Constantine Yankoglu, she went through a self-described "Protestant wilderness". As of June 2017, Heaton's first marriage had been annulled by the Catholic Church and she had returned to being a practicing Catholic.

Heaton has been open about having plastic surgery; citing having a tummy-tuck and a breast reduction after undergoing four Caesarean sections.

Politics
Heaton's political views have been described as conservative, and until 2021, she was a registered Republican.  In 2016, she voiced her disapproval of her party's then-presidential nominee Donald Trump. She later stated that she had "given up politics" following the election, but continued to express her admiration for Mitt Romney. On January 6, 2021, the same day as the 2021 United States Capitol attack, Heaton announced that she would leave the Republican Party and become an independent voter.

Abortion and birth control

Heaton is a consistent life ethicist and is vocally supportive of groups and causes opposing abortion, euthanasia, and the death penalty. Heaton's advocacy became particularly visible during the debate regarding the Terri Schiavo case. In addition, Heaton is honorary chair of Feminists for Life, an organization which opposes abortion and embryonic stem cell research and supports other anti-abortion causes on the basis of feminism.

On February 29, 2012, Heaton criticized Georgetown University law student Sandra Fluke, who advocated in favor of a contraceptive mandate for health insurance plans; Heaton said on Twitter, "I don't care if anyone uses birth control - just don't charge me for it", and wrote a series of tweets mocking Fluke's activism, as well as retweeting similar remarks from her followers. After incurring criticism, Heaton apologized and deleted most of the posts.

Other views
Despite later publicly walking back on these views, in 2003 Heaton used her influence as a major donor to St. James School to block a planned diversity and inclusion assembly. The assembly had been planned after a student with two gay adoptive parents had faced bullying for her parents’ sexual orientation. Heaton threatened to pull funding from the school if the assembly went forward.

In August 2006, Heaton's name was in an advertisement in the Los Angeles Times that condemned Hamas and Hezbollah and supported Israel in the 2006 Israel-Lebanon conflict.

In October 2006, Heaton appeared in a commercial opposing a Missouri state constitutional amendment concerning embryonic stem cell research, which subsequently passed. The advertisement was a response to the election of Democratic Senate hopeful Claire McCaskill and aired at the same time as Michael J. Fox's advertisement supporting the amendment. Appearing with Heaton were actor Jim Caviezel, St. Louis Cardinals pitcher Jeff Suppan, Seattle Mariner Mike Sweeney, and St. Louis Rams/Arizona Cardinals quarterback Kurt Warner. Following a public outcry, Heaton later said she regretted doing the ad and sent an apology to Fox, saying she was unaware of his ad. Fox accepted her apology and later stated, "If we can have a healthy dialogue about issues that people see differently, that's marvelous."

Filmography

Film

Television

Awards and nominations

The following are accolades and honors received by actress Patricia Heaton:

References

External links

 
 
 
 

1958 births
20th-century American actresses
20th-century Roman Catholics
21st-century American actresses
21st-century Roman Catholics
Activists from Ohio
Actresses from Cleveland
American anti-abortion activists
American expatriates in England
American feminists
American film actresses
American television actresses
American voice actresses
California Independents
California Republicans
Catholics from Ohio
American LGBT rights activists
Living people
Ohio Republicans
Ohio State University College of Arts and Sciences alumni
Outstanding Performance by a Lead Actress in a Comedy Series Primetime Emmy Award winners
American women comedians